ATP-binding cassette transporter ABCA1 (member 1 of human transporter sub-family ABCA), also known as the cholesterol efflux regulatory protein (CERP) is a protein which in humans is encoded by the ABCA1 gene. This transporter is a major regulator of cellular cholesterol and phospholipid homeostasis.

Tangier disease 
It was discovered that a mutation in the ABCA1 protein is responsible for causing Tangier disease by several groups in 1998. Gerd Schmitz's group in Germany and Michael Hayden's group in British Columbia were using standard genetics techniques and DNA from family pedigrees to locate the mutation. Richard Lawn's group at CV Therapeutics in Palo Alto, CA used cDNA microarrays, which were relatively new at the time, to assess gene expression profiles from cell lines created from normal and affected individuals. They showed cell lines from patients with Tangier's disease showed differential regulation of the ABCA1 gene. Subsequent sequencing of the gene identified the mutations. This group received an award from the American Heart Association for their discovery. Tangier disease has been identified in nearly 100 patients worldwide, and patients have a broad range of biochemical and clinical phenotypes as over 100 different mutations have been identified in ABCA1 resulting in the disease.

Function 
The membrane-associated protein encoded by this gene is a member of the superfamily of ATP-binding cassette (ABC) transporters. ABC proteins transport various molecules across extra- and intracellular membranes.  ABC genes are divided into seven distinct subfamilies (ABCA, MDR/TAP, MRP, ALD, OABP, GCN20, White).  This protein is a member of the ABCA subfamily. Members of the ABCA subfamily comprise the only major ABC subfamily found exclusively in multicellular eukaryotes. With cholesterol as its substrate, this protein functions as a cholesterol efflux pump in the cellular lipid removal pathway.

While the complete 3D-structure of ABCA1 remains relatively unknown, there has been some determination of the c-terminus. The ABCA1 c-terminus contains a PDZ domain, responsible for mediating protein-protein interactions, as well as a VFVNFA motif essential for lipid efflux activity.

Physiological role 
ABCA1 mediates the efflux of cholesterol and phospholipids to lipid-poor apolipoproteins (apoA1 and apoE) (reverse cholesterol transport), which then form nascent high-density lipoproteins (HDL). It also mediates the transport of lipids between Golgi and cell membrane. Since this protein is needed throughout the body it is expressed ubiquitously as a 220 kDa protein. It is present in higher quantities in tissues that shuttle or are involved in the turnover of lipids such as the liver, the small intestine and adipose tissue.

Factors that act upon the ABCA1 transporter's expression or its posttranslational modification are also molecules that are involved in its subsequent function like fatty acids, cholesterol and also cytokines and cAMP. Adiponectin induces reverse cholesterol transport by an ABCA1-dependent pathway. Other endogenous metabolites more loosely related to the ABCA1 functions are also reported to influence the expression of this transporter, including glucose and bilirubin.

Interactions between members of the apoliprotein family and ABCA1 activate multiple signalling pathways, including the JAK-STAT, PKA, and PKC pathways

Overexpression of ABCA1 has been reported to induce resistance to the anti-inflammatory diarylheptanoid antioxidant curcumin.
Downregulation of ABCA1 in senescent macrophages disrupts the cell's ability to remove cholesterol from its cytoplasm, leading the cells to promote pathologic atherogenesis (blood vessel thickening/hardening) which "plays a central role in common age-associated diseases such as atherosclerosis, cancer, and macular degeneration" Knockout mouse models of AMD treated with agonists that increase ABCA1 in loss of function and gain of function experiments demonstrated the protective role of elevating ABCA1 in regulating angiogenesis in eye disease. Human data from patients and controls were used to demonstrate the translation of mouse findings in human disease.

Clinical significance 
Mutations in this gene have been associated with Tangier disease and familial high-density lipoprotein deficiency. ABCA1 has been shown to be reduced in Tangier disease which features physiological deficiencies of HDL.
Leukocytes ABCA1 gene expression is upregulated in postmenopausal women receiving hormone replacement therapy (HRP). ABCA1 expression is  also upregulated in tumor-associated astroctytes surrounding glioblastoma brain tumors, and is important to the tumor progression.

Interactive pathway map

Interactions 
ABCA1 has been shown to interact with:
 APOA1, 
 APOE, 
 FADD, 
 SNTB2, and
 XPC.

See also 
 ATP-binding cassette transporter

References

Further reading

External links 
  
 

ATP-binding cassette transporters